Port-Salut is a coastal commune in the Sud department of Haiti.

Port-Salut is a popular destination for local Haitians, as well as tourists, due to the surrounding beaches.

Port-Salut is the hometown of Haiti's former president, Jean-Bertrand Aristide, who was born there in 1953, and is also the hometown of former prime minister, Jean-Marie Cherestal.

References

External links
Detailed map of Haiti
recent article on Port Salut
Auberge du rayon vert;local hotel with major impact in Cayes and Port Salut

Populated places in Sud (department)
Beaches of Haiti
Communes of Haiti